Mike Evans Kibwage (born 1 October 1997) is a Kenya footballer who plays as a defender for Kenya Commercial Bank S.C. and the Kenya national team.
Mike a former student of Mukumu Boys High School (class of 2016), in Kakamega is considered one of the best center backs in east Africa with his composure on the ball and leadership skills unrivalled.

Club career
Kibwage made his debut for Kenyan Premier League club AFC Leopards in 2017 in a match against Tusker F.C in 2017, he went on to make 47 appearances for the team and won the GOTV shield in 2017 with them. In 2018, Kibwage moved to KCB S.C and made his debut against Kakamega Homeboyz at Bukhungu stadium.

International career
Kibwage made his debut for Kenya in 2018 against Swaziland. He has 14 caps for the national team.

Career statistics

International
Statistics accurate as of match played 11 September 2018

Honours 
GoTV Shield: winner (2017 GoTv Shield,

References

External links
 

1997 births
Living people
Kenyan footballers
Kenya international footballers
Association football defenders
A.F.C. Leopards players
Kenya Commercial Bank S.C. players
Kenyan Premier League players